"Thru Your Phone" is a song recorded by American rapper Cardi B for her debut studio album Invasion of Privacy (2018). It was written by Cardi B, Jordan Thorpe, Justin Tranter, Alexandra Tamposi, and its producers Benny Blanco and Andrew Wotman, with additional production from Louis Bell. "Thru Your Phone" entered at number 50 on the US Billboard Hot 100 the week following the album's release. The song was certified Platinum by the Recording Industry Association of America (RIAA).

Composition
Lyrically, "Thru Your Phone" is about the protagonist finding explicit conversations on her partner's mobile phone and contemplates revenge on him. A Billboard article deemed the song "the rap equivalent of Jazmine Sullivan's "Bust Your Windows", while a Rolling Stone article noted it as one of the two "most emotionally hardcore" songs in the parent album—the other being "I Do"—that builds on the rage of "Be Careful", and compared it to a doo-wop ballad.

Critical reception
Neil Z. Yeung of AllMusic deemed the track "unflinching and relatable," and considered the vengeance lines where the narrator poisons her cheating man with bleach in his cereal and "a good old-fashioned" stabbing, "cartoonish but real, a confession of thoughts that are all too familiar to the scorned." In NME, Nick Levine stated, "the way she flips from righteous fury to plaintive desperation on "Thru Your Phone", a track about her partner's infidelity, is thrilling and palpably emotional."

Charts

Certifications

References

External links

2018 songs
Cardi B songs
Songs written by Cardi B
Songs written by Ali Tamposi
Songs written by Benny Blanco
Songs written by Justin Tranter
Songs written by Andrew Watt (record producer)
Song recordings produced by Benny Blanco
Songs about infidelity
Songs about telephone calls
Songs about revenge
Songs written by Pardison Fontaine